Faama is a Mandinka word meaning "father," "leader," or "king".  It was commonly used within the area of pre-imperial Mali.  The title spread into areas conquered by Mali and was later used by the Bamana Empire and the Wassoulou Empire of Samori Toure and non-Mandinka groups in the Kenedougou Empire.

See also
Mali Empire
Kenedougou Empire
Wassoulou Empire
Bamana Empire
Keita Dynasty
Kabadougou Kingdom

References

Bamana
Mali Empire
History of Africa
Royal titles